Disco King is a 1984 Telugu-language drama film, produced by Rakesh under the Sri Vishnu Films banner and directed by Tatineni Prasad. The film stars Nandamuri Balakrishna and Tulasi, with music composed by Chakravarthy. It is a remake of the Hindi film Disco Dancer (1982).

Plot
The film begins with Balakrishna a street performer, playing music with his uncle Venkatesh (Ranganath). Once Tulasi daughter of multi-millionaire Jagannatham (Jaggayya) loves his guitar tune and starts learning. Looking at it, enraged Jagannatham not only humiliates but also imprisons Balakrishna's mother Seeta (Sumitra) for a crime that makes them leave the city out of shame. Years roll by, Sudhakar (Sudhakar) the son of Jagannatham, a famous disco dancer, is a haughty spoiled brat. At a juncture, he affronts his manager Nutan Prasad (Nutan Prasad) so he quits his job and challenges to create a new star opposite to him. At the same time, he spots Balakrishna (Nandamuri Balakrishna), so, he arranges his show instead of Sudhakar which becomes a big hit. Here, Balakrishna is acquainted with Tulasi (Tulasi) with a petty quarrel. Soon, Balakrishna reaches the highest peak in his career and is untiled as Disco King who takes the throne from Sudhakar and wins the heart of Tulasi. Distressed Sudhakar becomes a drug addict, and witnessing it, frenzied Jagannatham intrigues to eliminate Balakrishna. So, they electrify his guitar with a high voltage current when, unfortunately, Seeta dies. There onwards, Balakrishna gets guitar phobia, moreover, Jagannatham's men break his legs but he recovers with the help of Tulasi. At present, Balakrishna has to vie in the All India Disco Competition where he is unable to hold the guitar even though Tulasi persuades him, besides Sudhakar heckles him. During that plight, Venkatesh arrives and emboldens him when he starts singing but Venkatesh dies while guarding Balakrishna against harm. At last, Balakrishna ceases Jagannatham & his men. Finally, the movie ends on a happy note with Balakrishna continuing his musical journey.

Cast
Nandamuri Balakrishna as Balakrishna
Tulasi as Tulasi
Jaggayya as Jagannatham
Sudhakar as Sudhakar
Nutan Prasad as Nutan Prasad
Ranganath as Venkatesh
Mikkilineni as Ali Baba
Sumitra as Seeta
Anupama

Soundtrack
Music composed by Chakravarthy. Lyrics were written by Veturi.

References

External links

 

1984 films
Films scored by K. Chakravarthy
Telugu remakes of Hindi films
Indian dance films
Disco films
1980s Telugu-language films
Films directed by T. L. V. Prasad